The MTV Movie Award for Best On-Screen Transformation is an award presented to an actor/actress for transformation in films at the MTV Movie Awards, a ceremony established in 1992. The MTV Movie Award for Best On-Screen Transformation was first given out in 2012 for Elizabeth Banks's transformation in the film The Hunger Games.

Best On-Screen Transformation

2010s

References

MTV Movie & TV Awards